Politics of French Polynesia takes place in a framework of a parliamentary representative democratic French overseas collectivity, whereby the President of French Polynesia is the head of government, and of a  multi-party system. Executive power is exercised by the government. Legislative power is vested in both the government and the  Assembly of French Polynesia.

Between 1946 and 2003, French Polynesia had the status of an overseas territory (French: territoire d'outre-mer, or TOM). In 2003 it became an overseas collectivity (French: collectivité d'outre-mer, or COM). Its statutory law of 27 February 2004 gives it the particular designation of "overseas country" to underline the large autonomy of the territory.

Executive branch

|High Commissioner
|Dominique Sorain
|Non-Partisan
|10 July 2019
|-
|President of French Polynesia
|Édouard Fritch
|Tapura Huiraatira
|18 mai 2018
|-
|President of the Assembly
|Gaston Tong Sang
|Tapura Huiraatira
|17 mai 2018
|}

The President of the French Republic is represented by the High Commissioner of the Republic in French Polynesia (Haut-Commissaire de la République en Polynésie française). The government is headed by the President of French Polynesia. He submits as Council of Ministers a list of members of the Territorial Assembly, the Assembly of French Polynesia (Assemblée de la Polynésie française), for approval by them to serve as ministers.

Legislative branch
French Polynesia elects the Assembly of French Polynesia (Assemblée de la Polynésie française), the unicameral legislature on the territorial level. The Assembly of French Polynesia has 57 members, elected for a five-year term by proportional representation in multi-seat constituencies. Since the territorial elections of March 6, 2001, the parity bill now binds that the number of women matches the number of men at the Assembly.

Political parties and elections
[For a full list of political parties, more information is provided here: List of political parties in French Polynesia]

The members of the Assembly of French Polynesia are elected in 6 different electoral districts or electoral circumscriptions which slightly differ from the administrative subdivisions (subdivisions administratives) on the Tuamotus and the Gambier Islands. The 6 electoral circumscriptions (circonscriptions électorales) are:
 electoral circumscription of the Windward Islands (circonscription des Îles du Vent) (37 members)
 electoral circumscription of the Leeward Islands (circonscription des Îles Sous-le-Vent) (8 members)
 electoral circumscription of the Austral Islands (circonscription des Îles Australes) (3 members)
 electoral circumscription of the Gambier Islands and the Islands Tuamotu-East (circonscription des Îles Gambier et Tuamotu Est) (3 members)
 electoral circumscription of the Islands Tuamotu-West (circonscription des Îles Tuamotu Ouest) (3 members)
 electoral circumscription of the Marquesas Islands (circonscription des Îles Marquises) (3 members)

Judicial branch

Court of Appeal or Cour d'Appel; Court of the First Instance or Tribunal de Premiere Instance; Court of Administrative Law or Tribunal Administratif.

Administrative divisions
French Polynesia has 5 administrative subdivisions:
 Windward Islands ( or officially subdivision administrative des Îles du Vent) (the two subdivisions administratives Windward Islands and Leeward Islands are part of the Society Islands)
 Leeward Islands ( or officially subdivision administrative des Îles Sous-le-Vent) (the two subdivisions administratives Windward Islands and Leeward Islands are part of the Society Islands)
 Marquesas Islands ( or officially subdivision administrative des (Îles) Marquises)
 Austral Islands ( or officially subdivision administrative des (Îles) Australes) (including the Bass Islands)
 Tuamotu-Gambier ( or officially subdivision administrative des (Îles) Tuamotu-Gambier) (the Tuamotus and the Gambier Islands)
note: Clipperton Island, just off the coast of Mexico, was administered by France from French Polynesia.

International organization participation
ESCAP (associate), FZ, ITUC, SPC, WMO

See also 
 2004 French Polynesian legislative election

References

External links 

 francepolitique.free.fr
 CIA World Factbook – French Polynesia